The Missouri Humanities Council, "Missouri Humanities" (MH) is a 501(c)(3), non-profit organization that was created in 1971 under authorizing legislation from the U.S. Congress to serve as one of the 56 state and territorial humanities councils that are affiliated with the National Endowment for the Humanities (NEH).

MH supports and provides programs that encourage family reading and support local museums, libraries, and other organizations promoting humanities education—facilitating public conversations on topics that include history, religion, archaeology, anthropology, philosophy, literature, law, ethics, and languages.

History and Structure 

In 1971, the National Endowment for the Humanities (NEH) contacted academic leaders in various states and asked them to form state committees to create a new form of adult education experience centered in humanities scholarship and related to public issues. The state committees were set up as grant-makers, similar to the NEH, and The Missouri Committee for the Humanities was among those first groups formed in 1971. Robert Walrond, a specialist in continuing education at St. Louis University, was among the group that founded the Missouri Committee, and he served as its executive director until 1986.

In 1976, Rhode Island Senator Claiborne Pell lead the revision of the federal statute that authorized the NEH to operate, naming the state councils as legitimate entities entitled to a portion of the NEH budget. This fundamental change led the state councils to formalize their incorporation in each state as tax-exempt, non-profit corporations, retaining their status as grantees of NEH.

The Missouri Humanities Council was formally incorporated as a non-profit organization in 1975 and received IRS 501(c)(3) status in April 1977. The office is currently located in St. Louis, Missouri. The board members of council, which include individuals nominated and elected by the council and members appointed by the governor of Missouri, are located across the state and come from diverse backgrounds including education, business, agriculture, museums and libraries, and law. The MHC bylaws currently call for the council to include no fewer than 24 and no more than 30 total board members, of whom up to six may be gubernatorial appointees. The board members of MHC hold three meetings per year at which the conduct business including review and voting on major grant applications.

Mission
MHC is committed to "building a thoughtful, engaged and civil society" by providing and supporting programs and projects which promote humanities education, encourage family reading, and assist Missouri museums, libraries, and community organizations in offering humanities-based activities.

To accomplish its goals, the organization has always worked to "create bridges" between humanities scholars and general public audiences. In recent years, MHC staff and board members also have come to place considerable emphasis on responding to what constituent and partner communities and organizations see as their needs and priorities, rather than from the "top down." Another equally important guiding principle is collaboration: in an era of diminishing resources, MHC works to extend its impact and relevance by engaging as much as possible with partners in its initiatives and programs. Recent partners have included the Mark Twain Boyhood Home and Museum, the Missouri History Museum, the Missouri Association of Museums and Archives, and the State Historical Society of Missouri.

Ongoing Programs and Partnerships
With an annual budget in the range of $1.2 million per year, and a staff of seven full-time employees, MHC offers a variety of programs. These include competitive grants to support humanities-related projects and programs around the state of Missouri, family reading initiatives, heritage tourism projects, and traveling exhibits. The council also collaborates in promoting and providing other public humanities programming such as a speakers' bureau and National History Day in Missouri, which are managed cooperatively with the State Historical Society of Missouri, and a workshop on teaching Mark Twain in the classroom—all of which combined to reach 112,541 individuals in 82 Missouri counties in 2012. Ongoing programs include:

READ from the START (RFTS)
READ from the START seeks to help parents understand the importance of early childhood reading and acquire skills and strategies that will help them to experience the joy of reading and sharing stories with their children. RFTS offers interactive workshops for parents and caregivers of young children, conducted on site at organizations that focus on serving low income, "at-risk" families.

Traveling Exhibits
In collaboration with the Missouri History Museum, MHC sends traveling exhibits to Missouri communities on subjects such as Missouri in the Civil War and helps develop programs and exhibits for the host communities to tell their own stories in the context of the larger statewide narrative.

Project and Program Grants
MHC awards competitive grants to Missouri institutions, organizations, and communities to help them develop and present high-quality, humanities-based programs, events, exhibits, and publications. There are two categories of grants: smaller grants of $2,500 or less, which are evaluated monthly; and major grants over $2,500, which are evaluated three times per year, in March, June, and September.

"Show Me Missouri" Speakers Services
In collaboration with the State Historical Society of Missouri, MHC maintains a network of experts and scholars to provide affordable, high-quality programs and presentations for organizations and institutions around the state.

Veterans' Creative Writing Initiative
In collaboration with various partners, MHC helps provide creative writing workshops for veterans. Other successful components of this program include an annual writing contest and production of an anthology, "Proud to Be," which is published in partnership with Warriors Arts Alliance and Southeast Missouri State University Press.

Heritage Tourism/Humanities Inventory Pilot Program
MHC is developing  an innovative effort to assist Missouri communities in preserving and sharing their stories through mobile technology.

The Missouri Humanities Awards
Each year, MHC recognizes excellence in humanities-based education, literature and community service.

Funding
Current funding sources for MHC include:
 The National Endowment for the Humanities
 The state of Missouri, through the Missouri Arts Council/Department of Economic Development (as spending authority from the humanities trust fund administered by the Treasurer of the State of Missouri, which was built up with monies allocated by the General Assembly from the "Out-of-state Athletes and Entertainers" income tax)
 Donations from individuals, including the MHC council members and staff 
 Corporate, foundation and institutional grants and sponsorships; recent sources include:
Target Corporation
Walmart
Custom Type
The Saigh Foundation
The Woman's City Club of Kansas City
Commerce Bank
Edward Jones Investments
Barnes & Noble—Jefferson City
Missouri American Water
Major foundation support for the MHC family reading initiatives provided by an anonymous donor

The future of public funding for the humanities is uncertain at present. Consequently, MHC has launched a serious effort to diversify its sources of funding and build relationships with potential corporate and foundation partners.

External links

Missouri Humanities Council home page
National Endowment for the Humanities
The Federation of State Humanities Councils
The State Historical Society of Missouri
Missouri History Museum

National Endowment for the Humanities
Non-profit organizations based in Missouri